Gerry Cawley originally from St Mawgan in Cornwall is well known for being a Cornish Wrestling Champion. Gerry Cawley retired from wrestling although very occasionally can still be found competing in the Cornish Wrestling ring.

In 2007, Cawley won the Cornish Heavyweight Wrestling Championship at Helston, as part of the Harvest Fair festivities. The event took place in front of a crowd of over 200 people, defeating Gareth Beale of Truro following 2 x 10 minute bouts plus 3 minutes extra time.

External links

Gerry Cawley's Website
The Final Round? BBC Southwest documentary
Cornish wrestling website

English male wrestlers
People from St Mawgan
Cornish wrestling champions
Living people
Year of birth missing (living people)